John Borthwick may refer to:
John Borthwick (footballer) (born 1964), English footballer
 John Borthwick (veterinary surgeon) (1867–1936), veterinary surgeon in the Cape Colony, South Africa
John David Borthwick (1824–1892), Scottish journalist and author
Sir John Thomas Borthwick, 3rd Baronet (1917–2002) of the Borthwick baronets
John Borthwick, 5th Lord Borthwick (died 1566)
John Borthwick, 8th Lord Borthwick (died 1623)
John Borthwick, 9th Lord Borthwick (1616–1675) (dormant 1675)
John Henry Stuart Borthwick, 23rd Lord Borthwick (1905–1996) (confirmed in title 1986)
John Hugh Borthwick, 24th Lord Borthwick (born 1940)
 Jack Borthwick (Australian footballer) (John Gerald Borthwick, 1884–1948), Australian rules footballer
 Jack Borthwick (footballer, born 1886) (John James Blacklaw Borthwick, 1886–1942), Scottish football centre half

See also
Borthwick (surname)